Jizi Temple is a temple in Danyang, Jiangsu province, China. It is famous for not only the scenic spots and historical sites such like Shizi Monument, Xiaoshui Stone, and Gihe Bridge, but also the tourist attraction known as the Boiling Wells.

History
Jizi Temple was built in order to honor and sacrifice Jizi after his death, which has two thousand years of history. Jizi, whose given name is Zha, was the youngest son of Mengshou, the emperor of Wu during the Spring and Autumn period (770-476 B.C.). He was a person of virtue, who not only had a noble character, but was also is a far-sighted politician and diplomatist. He made a great contribution to improving Huaxia culture.

Boiling Wells
The Boiling Wells of Jizi Temple are natural mineral springs is located beside a pool in front of the temple. According to historical records, there were originally a hundred wells (some of which were "boiling wells"), however flooding of the nearby Xiangcao River covered many of them, leaving only six remaining.

Water in the boiling wells is constantly bubbling, giving it the appearance of boiling, although the bubbling is actually caused by gas released from cracks beneath the wells. The water of each well is drinkable, and each well has a different flavour, apparently similar to beer or soft drinks.

References

800 × 600 pixels

Temples in China
Tourist attractions in Jiangsu
Buildings and structures in Zhenjiang
Religious buildings and structures in Jiangsu